Agni Pareeksha or Agni Pariksha may refer to:

 Agni Pariksha, a trial by fire described in the Hindu Sanskrit epic Ramayana
 Agni Pareeksha (1951 film), a Telugu film 
 Agni Pariksha (1954 film), a Bengali film with Uttam Kumar and Suchitra Sen
 Agni Pareeksha (1968 film), a Malayalam film 
 Agni Pareeksha (1970 film), a Telugu film 
 Agni Pareeksha (1981 film), a Hindi film produced by B. R. Chopra with Amol Palekar
 Agni Pareeksha (2006 film), a Bengali film 
 Agnipariksha (2009 TV series), a Bengali TV series
 Agnipariksha (2021 TV series), an Indian Telugu-language series

See also
 Agni Parikrama